Mikhail Mikhailovich Filippov (born 10 June 1992) is a Russian professional football player. He plays as a goalkeeper for FC Shinnik Yaroslavl.

Club career
He made his Russian Premier League debut for FC Yenisey Krasnoyarsk on 7 October 2018 in a game against FC Spartak Moscow.

On 19 February 2019, he joined FC Rotor Volgograd on loan until the end of the 2018–19 season.

References

External links
 
 

1992 births
People from Volzhsky, Volgograd Oblast
Sportspeople from Volgograd Oblast
Living people
Russian footballers
Russia youth international footballers
Association football goalkeepers
FC Saturn Ramenskoye players
FC Tom Tomsk players
FC Znamya Truda Orekhovo-Zuyevo players
FC Spartak-2 Moscow players
FC Yenisey Krasnoyarsk players
FC Rotor Volgograd players
FC Torpedo Moscow players
FC Chayka Peschanokopskoye players
FC Shinnik Yaroslavl players
Russian Premier League players
Russian First League players
Russian Second League players